Peter Rabbit is a 2018 live-action/3D computer-animated comedy film based upon the character of the same name created by Beatrix Potter, co-produced by Columbia Pictures, Sony Pictures Animation, Olive Bridge Entertainment, Animal Logic, 2.0 Entertainment, and Screen Australia, and distributed by Sony Pictures Releasing. It was directed by Will Gluck, who also produced the film with Zareh Nalbandian, from a screenplay and story written by Gluck and Rob Lieber. James Corden stars as the voice of the title character, with Rose Byrne, Domhnall Gleeson, and Sam Neill in live-action roles, as well as the voices of Daisy Ridley, Elizabeth Debicki, and Margot Robbie. The film's story focuses on Peter Rabbit as he deals with new problems when the late Mr. McGregor's great nephew arrives and discovers the trouble Peter's family can get into.

Peter Rabbit was released by Columbia Pictures in the United States on February 9, 2018, in the United Kingdom on March 16, 2018, and in Australia on March 22, 2018. The film received mixed reviews from critics mainly for its deviations from the source material. It also grossed $351 million worldwide on a $50 million budget. A sequel, Peter Rabbit 2: The Runaway, was released in 2021 without the involvement of Sony Pictures Animation.

Plot

In England's Lake District, Peter Rabbit, his cousin, Benjamin Bunny and his triplet sisters, Flopsy, Mopsy and Cottontail, spend most of their days picking on old Mr. McGregor, who had killed and eaten their father, and stealing vegetables from his garden. They are friends with a kind-hearted local resident named Bea, who took on a motherly role with the rabbits ever since their mother's death and who spends her time painting pictures of the rabbits as well as the surrounding nature. One day, Peter is forced to leave his jacket in Mr. McGregor's garden and goes back to retrieve it. However, it was a trap set by Mr. McGregor; he catches him, but suddenly dies of a heart attack, having lived an unhealthy lifestyle (including smoking and a poor diet) for many years. Enthralled, Peter invites all of the local animals and takes over Mr. McGregor's manor.

Meanwhile, in London, McGregor's great-nephew, Thomas McGregor, an uptight, controlling workaholic, works in the toy department of Harrods, where he waits for a promotion to associate general manager. After losing the promotion to a lazy nephew of the managing director, Thomas loses his temper and gets fired. When Thomas learns that his great-uncle's manor is valuable and that he has inherited it, he decides to appraise and prepare it for resale in order to start his own toy store near Harrods to get his revenge. He kicks out Peter and the other animals and begins to upgrade the security of the garden wall and gates. When Peter and a reluctant Benjamin sneak back into the garden, Thomas catches the latter and attempts to drown Benjamin in a water; Benjamin's relatives rescue him and Thomas instead accidentally drops a prized set of binoculars that Bea had given him earlier. Angry, Thomas tries to buy an electric fence and a supply of dynamite to ward off the rabbits.

Thomas and Bea end up falling in love with each other, much to Peter's jealousy. He and Thomas start a war with each other by setting traps and other offensive nuisances. Things get out of hand when Peter rewires the electric fence to give Thomas a shock when he touches any doorknob leading to the outside, prompting Thomas to throw the dynamite in the rabbit hole. After the rabbits trigger Thomas' allergy to blackberries, he attacks them in the garden with some of the dynamite, on the warpath against them and tells Peter that his antics caused him to become aggressive. Bea, having heard the commotion, comes by, and Peter detonates the dynamite, proving to Bea that Thomas was using it, but accidentally blows up the rabbit hole, causing the tree on top to collapse on Bea's art studio. Bea ignores Thomas's explanation of the rabbits' involvement and ends their relationship, leaving a heartbroken Thomas to return to London.

Peter feels remorseful for the damage his recklessness has caused and upon learning that Bea intends to leave the neighborhood, he and Benjamin head to London to bring Thomas back. Making Thomas think that he was imagining the rabbits' ability to talk, Peter encourages him to follow his heart. They rush back to the country, where Peter shows Bea the detonator and presses it for her to see, thus confirming Thomas' previous claims that a rabbit caused the explosion. Bea forgives them and decides not to move away.

Peter and the other animals drive away an unpleasant wealthy couple who had bought the house. Thomas and Bea resume their relationship, and he allows the wildlife to take food from the garden within reason. Peter and his family restore the burrow, and the yard with Thomas and Bea's help and Thomas sets up his own toy shop in the village, where Bea showcases her paintings of the rabbits.

Cast

Live-action actors
 Domhnall Gleeson as Thomas McGregor, Mr. McGregor's great nephew.
 Rose Byrne as Bea, the owner of the rabbits and Thomas’ love interest.
 Sam Neill as Mr. McGregor, Thomas McGregor's great uncle.
 Marianne Jean-Baptiste as Harrods General Manager.
 Felix Williamson as Derek.

Voice actors
 James Corden as Peter Rabbit, Mr. Rabbit and Josephine's son, Flopsy, Mopsy and Cottontail's brother and Benjamin's cousin. 
 Margot Robbie as Flopsy Rabbit, Mr. Rabbit and Josephine's daughter, Peter, Mopsy and Cottontail's sister, Benjamin's cousin and the film's narrator
 Elizabeth Debicki as Mopsy Rabbit, Mr. Rabbit and Josephine's daughter, Peter, Flopsy and Cottontail's sister and Benjamin's cousin.
 Daisy Ridley as Cottontail Rabbit, Mr. Rabbit and Josephine's daughter, Peter, Flopsy and Mopsy's sister and Benjamin's cousin.
 Colin Moody as Benjamin Bunny, Peter, Flopsy, Mopsy and Cottontail's cousin and Mr. Rabbit and Josephine's nephew.
 Sia as Mrs. Tiggy-Winkle
 Domhnall Gleeson as Mr. Jeremy Fisher
 Rose Byrne as Jemima Puddle-Duck
 Sam Neill as Tommy Brock
 Fayssal Bazzi as Mr. Tod
 Ewen Leslie as Pigling Bland
 Christian Gazal as Felix D'eer
 Rachel Ward as Josephine Rabbit, Peter, Flopsy, Mopsy and Cottontail's mother and Benjamin's aunt.
 Bryan Brown as Mr. Rabbit, Peter, Flopsy, Mopsy and Cottontail's father and Benjamin's uncle.
 David Wenham as Johnny Town-Mouse
 Will Reichelt as JW Rooster II
 Jessica Freedman, Shana Halligan, Katharine Hoye, Chris Mann, Chad Reisser and Fletcher Sheridan as the Singing Sparrows

Production
The film was first revealed in April 2015 through email leaks as a result of the Sony Pictures hack. The official announcement of the film came that December.

In August 2016, Will Gluck was reported to direct from a script by Gluck and Rob Lieber, with James Corden cast as the voice of Peter Rabbit and Rose Byrne in one of the live-action roles. Two years later around the time of the film's release, Byrne said that her character was a re-imagined version of Beatrix Potter. Daisy Ridley and Elizabeth Debicki joined the cast in September 2016, and principal photography was scheduled to commence in Sydney, Australia, in January 2017. The next month, Domhnall Gleeson was cast as Thomas McGregor, the descendant of the original Mr. McGregor, and Margot Robbie joined the cast, expected to voice a bunny, Flopsy. In November, Sia was cast as Mrs. Tiggy-Winkle.

On December 18, 2016, a first image of the title character, along with the film's logo, was revealed. Production began in December 2016. Gluck produced the film along with Zareh Nalbandian of Animal Logic, which provided the visual effects and animation for the film. The crew peaked at 80 animators, working as 6 core teams, each with a lead animator and a technical animator. Live-action scenes were filmed at Centennial Park in Sydney. and in Ambleside, Cumbria UK. In March 2017, filming took place at Central railway station, Sydney, which was depicted as London Paddington station along with Mortuary railway station being depicted as Windermere station. The soundtrack features a version of the song "Steal My Sunshine" by the band Len with the lyrics rewritten to be about Peter Rabbit.

Release
Peter Rabbit was originally scheduled to be released in the United States on March 23, 2018, but it was moved up to be released on February 9, 2018. The film was later released in the United Kingdom on March 16, and in Australia on March 22.

Trailer criticism
The first trailer received negative feedback from critics and fans of the character, many of whom labelled the film as being too modern and insulting to Beatrix Potter's works. Collider called the trailer "garbage" and a "low brow 'comedy' cringe fest".

Stuart Heritage from The Guardian stated, "the Peter Rabbit film looks like the result of some blisteringly inept manhandling [...] there's something genuinely harrowing about the sight of Peter Rabbit – gentle, Edwardian Peter Rabbit – thoughtlessly injuring some birds, or grabbing a pile of lettuce leaves and making it rain like a banker in a strip club, or literally twerking," and argued, "there is no way on Earth that [Beatrix Potter would] have ever given the green light to a slow-motion car crash like this."

Metro writer James Baldock found that the trailer was "so gut-wrenchingly bad" and that "if the movie lives up to its two-minute preview – [it] is set to be the greatest abomination to grace the big screen since The Emoji Movie." He finished by writing, "Listen carefully, and you can just about hear the sound of Beatrix Potter, turning furiously in her grave." On November 7, a new trailer for the United Kingdom was released.

Box office
Peter Rabbit grossed $115.3 million in the United States and Canada, and $235.9 million in other territories, for a worldwide total of $351.2 million, against a production budget of $50 million.

In the United States and Canada, the film was released alongside Fifty Shades Freed and The 15:17 to Paris, and was projected to gross around $16 million from 3,725 theaters in its opening weekend, with some estimates as high as $25 million. It ended up making $25 million over the weekend, finishing second at the box office behind Fifty Shades ($38.8 million). The film dropped 30% in its second weekend to $17.5 million ($23.4 million over the four-day Martin Luther King Jr. weekend), finishing second behind newcomer Black Panther.

In the UK, Peter Rabbit became the biggest family film of 2018, overtaking Pixar's Coco with $56.3 million. Totals from other markets include China ($26.5 million), Australia ($20.2 million), France ($12.3 million) and Germany ($12.1 million).

Home media
The film was released by Sony Pictures Home Entertainment on digital platforms on April 20, 2018. A Blu-ray, DVD and 4K Ultra HD followed on May 1, 2018. The Blu-ray extra features include "Shake Your Cotton-Tail Dance Along" (a dance-along to the song "I Promise You"), "Peter Rabbit: Mischief in the Making" (a seven-minute behind-the-scenes video), and "Flopsy Turvy" (a mini-movie focusing on Peter's triplet sisters). In the United States, a Special Garden Edition Blu-ray & DVD was released as a Target exclusive with a bonus disc featuring a seventeen-minute featurette titled "Make Your Own Garden".

Reception

Critical response
The website's critical consensus reads, "Peter Rabbit updates Beatrix Potter's classic characters with colourfully  agreeable results that should entertain younger viewers while admittedly risking the wrath of purists." On Metacritic, the film has a score of 51 out of 100 based on 26 critics, indicating "mixed or average reviews". Audiences polled by CinemaScore gave the film an average grade of "A−" on an A+ to F scale.

Olly Richards at Empire gave the film 3 out of 5 stars, praising the "splendid" animation and Gleeson's performance, though he felt that Corden had been miscast. Chris Nashawaty at Entertainment Weekly gave the film a 'B' grade, saying it was "clever, and funny, and moves as fast as a tyke on a sugar bender", noting its differences with the source material. Robbie Collin at The Daily Telegraph gave it 2 out of 5 stars, praising the "appealing double act" of Gleeson and Byrne but comparing the film unfavourably to Paddington and criticising the characterisation of Peter Rabbit. Susan Wloszczyna on RogerEbert.com gave it 2 out of 4 stars, agreeing that Peter "goes from likably cheeky chap to sneering sadist".

Mark Kermode was critical of the film associating itself with the books, saying, "If you've read the books you will be appalled," and adding, "I think if you can read you're likely to be appalled." James Corden's father, Malcolm, complained about the review and the description of his son as "appallingly irritating".

Controversy
In the first week after the film's release, groups in multiple countries criticized it for "allergy bullying" and called for an apology from Sony. The accusations focused on a scene where Thomas McGregor, who is known to be allergic to blackberries, is pelted with them until one lands in his mouth, causing him to suffer an allergic reaction requiring the use of his Epipen. In response, Sony published a statement saying, "We sincerely regret not being more aware and sensitive to this issue, and we truly apologize". In his review, Robbie Collin said, "...it is a horrible scene – not because allergies are comedically untouchable, but because it makes Peter an irredeemably nasty piece of work."

Accolades

Sequel

Sony Pictures released a sequel entitled Peter Rabbit 2: The Runaway in Australia on March 25, 2021, then in the United Kingdom on May 21, and in the United States on June 11. It was initially set to be released in the United States on April 3, 2020, in Australia on March 19, 2020, and in the United Kingdom on March 27, 2020. The film was delayed multiple times due to the COVID-19 pandemic, before moving to its final release dates. Gluck returned to write and direct the film.

References

External links

 
 

2018 films
2018 3D films
2018 comedy films
2018 computer-animated films
2010s American animated films
2010s children's adventure films
2010s children's comedy films
2010s children's fantasy films
2010s adventure comedy-drama films
2010s fantasy adventure films
2010s English-language films
American 3D films
American computer-animated films
American children's animated adventure films
American children's animated comedy films
American children's animated drama films
American children's animated fantasy films
American comedy-drama films
American adventure comedy films
American fantasy adventure films
American films with live action and animation
Australian 3D films
Australian computer-animated films
Australian children's adventure films
Australian children's comedy films
Australian children's drama films
Australian animated fantasy films
Australian comedy-drama films
Australian adventure comedy films
Australian fantasy adventure films
British 3D films
British computer-animated films
British children's adventure films
British children's comedy films
British children's drama films
British animated fantasy films
British comedy-drama films
British adventure comedy films
British fantasy adventure films
3D animated films
Peter Rabbit
Peter Rabbit (film series)
Animated films based on children's books
Animated films about rabbits and hares
Animated films about siblings
Films about death
Animated films about orphans
Animated films about foxes
Films about badgers
Films about hedgehogs
Films about ducks
Animated films about pigs
Animated films about chickens
Obscenity controversies in film
Obscenity controversies in animation
Advertising and marketing controversies in film
Film controversies
Animated films set in London
Animated films set in England
Films shot in Sydney
Films directed by Will Gluck
Films scored by Dominic Lewis
Columbia Pictures films
Columbia Pictures animated films
Sony Pictures Animation films
Animal Logic films
2010s British films